Final Score (formerly FSN Final Score) is an American nightly sports news program that aired on Fox Sports Net. The program debuted on July 3, 2006 and aired at 10:30 p.m. local time Monday through Friday, with replays at various times in overnight hours and again every Monday through Friday morning starting at 7 a.m. and repeating twice. It was cancelled as of Friday, July 1, 2011. Final Score consisted of highlights of the night's sporting events, as well as a wrapup of some news items away from the venue of play.  The program consisted of no additional analyses or feature stories, except on nights when very few games were played.

Program history
Final Score debuted on July 3, 2006 and was the first nationwide sportscast to air on the collection of regional sports networks since the National Sports Report was cancelled in 2002. Van Earl Wright was the only former anchor of the NSR to appear on this show; he was released by FSN in the summer of 2007.

Unlike the show's predecessor, Final Score was from the outset intended as a half-hour program and was accordingly fashioned to not waste time, emphasizing speed; FSN conducted online surveys in an attempt to gauge what viewers wanted from a highlights/news show, and speed was the biggest factor in participants' minds. The show's graphics were created by Troika Design, based around the concept of a "sports SIM card" that would "download" highlights, with a graphical L-bar akin to that used by Bloomberg TV, featuring sports scores in a bar along the bottom, FoxSports.com on MSN headlines in a scrolling ticker above that, and "The Rundown" of games being shown in the program along the right side of the screen.

From November 19, 2006 to sometime early in 2009, all affiliates replayed the show at midnight Monday through Friday and 10:30 p.m. and 1 a.m. Saturdays and Sundays. (Some affiliates also aired this show at 10 p.m. Sundays, with an immediate replay.) The times became effective on November 19, 2006; before that, the show aired at 11:30 p.m. local time Monday through Friday, 10:30 p.m. Saturday, and 9:30 p.m. Sunday. Fox College Sports also aired FCS Final Score updates, featuring the usual anchors and graphics, once an hour.

The name of the program was changed on April 23, 2008.  The letters "FSN" were removed from the show title, the FSN logo was removed from the title card and other graphics, and all mention of the FoxSports.com website with which the show was associated was also omitted. FSN did not explain why it removed its own brand, but DirecTV's on-screen guide and TV Guide-supplied EPG listings still listed the program's name as the old title until January 1, 2009, when the title was changed on both guides.

It was known that the program was, by the end of its' run, copyright tagged "Copyright 2011/National Sports Programming/All Rights Reserved" in the closing credit, with no mention of Fox or FSN. This indicates a model closer to syndication than an actual working network. The regional sports networks that aired this program had a variety of owners at the time: News Corporation, Comcast, DirecTV Sports Networks, and Cablevision.

Danyelle Sargent took maternity leave in December 2009 and subsequently became a mother.

The show announced its cancellation on Friday, July 1, 2011. The main reasons for the show's cancellation were low ratings as well as several FSN affiliates dropping the show in favor of regional sports news programs. It has since been succeeded by Fox Sports Live, the flagship program of Fox Sports 1, launched in 2013 and cancelled in 2017.

Anchors
Barry LeBrock (2006–2011)
Danyelle Sargent (2006–2011)
Andrew Siciliano (2006–2011)
Greg Wolf (2006–2011)
Randy Kerdoon (2006)
Van Earl Wright (2006–2007)

References

2006 American television series debuts
2011 American television series endings
American sports television series
Fox Sports Networks original programming